Graciela Larios Rivas (born 10 February 1950) is a Mexican politician affiliated with the Institutional Revolutionary Party. As of 2014 she served as Senator of the LVI and LVII Legislatures of the Mexican Congress and as  Deputy of the LIX Legislature as a plurinominal representative.

References

1950 births
Living people
Politicians from Colima
People from Colima City
Members of the Congress of Colima
Women members of the Senate of the Republic (Mexico)
Members of the Senate of the Republic (Mexico)
Members of the Chamber of Deputies (Mexico)
Institutional Revolutionary Party politicians
20th-century Mexican politicians
20th-century Mexican women politicians
21st-century Mexican politicians
21st-century Mexican women politicians
Women members of the Chamber of Deputies (Mexico)